Savilian Professor may refer to:

Savilian Professor of Astronomy, University of Oxford, England
Savilian Professor of Geometry, University of Oxford, England